Andy Jeferson Polar Paredes (born 17 February 1997) is a Peruvian footballer who plays as a midfielder or winger for Binacional.

Career

At the age of 14, Polar debuted for his neighborhood side at the Copa Perú. Before the 2016 season, Polar signed for Binacional in the Peruvian third division, helping them earn promotion to the Peruvian top flight and win their only top flight title.

References

External links

 

Peruvian footballers
Living people
Association football midfielders
Association football wingers
1997 births
Deportivo Binacional FC players
People from Arequipa
Peruvian Primera División players